This article lists some of the aviation accidents and incidents in Sri Lanka from the 1910s to the 2000s.

1910s
In November 1911, an aircraft that was trying the establish the record for the first flight over Ceylon, hit the Old Royal College Building when it was under construction. Aircraft landed and later reattempted the record.

1960
On February 1, 1960, a Jet Provost of the Royal Ceylon Air Force preparing for the fly past on Independence Day flamed out shortly after take-off. The pilot ejected safely and the plane crashed into the Negombo Lagoon.

1966
 A Jet provost crashed into the coconut trees surrounding Katunayake airport, killing its pilot Flt Sgt Shaheer Sally

1970s
 April 12, 1971, a Jet Provost of the Royal Ceylon Air Force crashed in Trincomalee killing its pilot. 
 November 15, 1978, the Icelandic Airlines Flight 001 a Douglas DC-8 crash on approach to Colombo International Airport, killed 8 of the 13 Icelandic crew members, 5 reserve crew members and 170 (mostly Indonesian) out of a total of 262 passengers and crew.
 December 4, 1974 the Martinair Flight 138, a Douglas DC-8 crash into a mountain on approach to Colombo International Airport, killing all 191 people aboard.

1980s
On May 3, 1986 Air Lanka Flight 512 which was a Lockheed L-1011 Tristar that was about to depart to Maldives, having been delayed, when it was ripped in two by a bomb placed by the LTTE in the 'Fly Away Kit', killing 21 people and wounding 41.

1990s
 On September 13, 1990 a SLAF SIAI-Marchetti SF.260 was shot down by the LTTE due to AA fire; the pilot was killed.
 July 5, 1992 a SLAF Shaanxi Y-8 crashed in Iyakatchitchy en route to Palay kill all 20 on board, LTTE claimed to have shot it down.   
 On July 14, 1992 a SLAF SIAI-Marchetti SF.260TP was shot down by LTTE; the pilot was killed. 
 On October 13, 1992 a SLAF FMA IA 58 Pucará crashed near Jaffna.  
 On April 28, 1995 a SLAF Avro 748 was shot down by the LTTE using a man-portable air-defense system (MANPADS) killing all 51 crew and passengers.
On April 29, 1995 a second SLAF Avro 748 was shot down by the LTTE using a MANPADS killing all 54 crew and passengers. 
On July 14, 1995, a SLAF FMA IA 58 Pucará was shotdown by the LTTE using a MANPADS during fierce fighting in the Northern Province, near Jaffna, killing its pilot.
On September 13, 1995 an Antonov An-32 was missed, killing all 7 crew and 78 passengers.
On September 29, 1998 an Antonov An-24RV operating as Lionair Flight 602 was shot down by the LTTE using a MANPADS, killing all 7 crew and 48 passengers.

2000s
In August 2000, a Sri Lanka Air Force MiG-27 crashed near Colombo International Airport, killing its Ukrainian pilot. 
An LTTE attack on July 24, 2001 on the ground attack on the Colombo International Airport, resulted in destruction 8 SLAF aircraft and 3 Sri Lankan Airlines Airbus A330s and Airbus A340s. 
In June 2004, a MiG-27 crashed into the sea near the Colombo International Airport. 
On October 22, 2007 a raid on SLAF Anuradhapura by LTTE resulted in 8 SLAF aircraft destroyed on the ground and another 10 damaged. A SLAF Bell 212 that was deployed for air defense during the attack crashed due to mechanical problems killing its crew.

2010s
On March 2, 2011 two SLAF IAI Kfirs on rehearsal for a fly past resulted in a mid air collision. Pilots of both air craft ejected but one of the pilots were killed.
On 13 February 2012 a SLAF MiG 27 crashed in Dummalasuriya area in Puttlam while on a routine training flight, pilot managed to eject from the jet without sustaining injuries.
 On 12 December 2014, a Sri Lankan Air Force, An-32 transport aircraft carrying 5 people crashed  on  approach to land at the Rathmalana Airport after taking off from Katunayaka Bandaranayake International Airport. The pilot, co-pilot and two of the air crew were killed in the crash and the fifth crew member suffered critical injuries and later died of his injuries.

References